Arthur Edwards was a British sailor and merchant who was sent to the Persian royal court (Tahmasp I) in 1566. He worked for Muscovy Company. Shah Tahmasb gave him permission to trade in Persia (Iran).

References 
 The First English Explorer: The life of Anthony Jenkinson (1529-1611) p.338 2019 December 31 
 The thirde voyage into Persia, begun in the yeere 1565. by Richard Johnson, Alexander Kitchin, and Arthur Edwards. perseus.tufts.edu - 2019 December 31 
 Persia and the Persian Question, Volume 2 - 2019 December 31
 Hakluyt's Collection of the Early Voyages, Travels, and ..., Volume 1 p. 398 - 2019 December 31
 The Hakluyt Handbook, Issue 144 2019 December 31
 The English amongst the Persians: During the Qajar period 1787-1921 Paperback – 1977 by Denis Wright  (Author) 2019 December 31

British sailors
British explorers
Iran–United Kingdom relations